A beam spoiler is a piece of material, placed into the path of the photon beam in radiotherapy. The purpose of the spoiler is to reduce the depth of the maximum radiation dosage.

Composition 
The beam spoiler is composed of a sheet of material which has a low atomic number, typically lucite, the thickness of which is varied according to the beam energy and the distance by which the radiation dose must be shifted.

Action
As the primary photon beam passes through the plate, secondary electrons are generated. The beam exiting the spoiler is a combination of the spoiler-attenuated photons and the spoiler-generated electrons. The electron component alters the depth dose in the buildup region in a way that depends on the photon beam energy, the field size, and the distance of the spoiler from the treatment surface.

References 

Radiobiology